The 1982 King Cup was the 24th season of the knockout competition since its establishment in 1956. Al-Nassr were the defending champions but they were eliminated by Al-Shabab in the Round of 16.

Al-Hilal won their 4th title after defeating Al-Ittihad 3–1 in the final.

Bracket

Source: Al-Jazirah

Round of 32
The matches of the Round of 32 were played on 11, 12 and 13 April 1982.

Round of 16
The Round of 16 matches were held on 15 and 16 April 1982.

Quarter-finals
The Quarter-final matches were held on 22 and 23 April 1982.

Semi-finals
The four winners of the quarter-finals progressed to the semi-finals. The semi-finals were played on 29 and 30 April 1982. All times are local, AST (UTC+3).

Final
The final was played between Al-Ittihad and Al-Hilal in the Youth Welfare Stadium in Al-Malaz, Riyadh.

References

1982
Saudi Arabia
Cup